Lionel Smith may refer to:

 Lionel Smith (footballer) (1920–1980), English footballer
 Lionel Mark Smith (1946–2008), American actor
 Sir Lionel Smith, 1st Baronet (1778–1842), British diplomat, colonial administrator and soldier
 Lionel Smith (athlete), New Zealand hurdler
 Lionel Smith (legal scholar), Canadian legal scholar, fifteenth Downing Professor of the Laws of England